The 1972 U.S. Women's Open was the 27th U.S. Women's Open, held June 29 to July 2 at the East Course of Winged Foot Golf Club in Mamaroneck, New York.

Susie Berning won the second of her three U.S. Women's Open titles, a stroke ahead of runners-up Kathy Ahern, Pam Barnett, and Judy Rankin. Berning opened with a 79 (+7) and started the final round at 228 (+12), four strokes behind 54-hole leader Barnett. Berning carded a one-under 71 for the third of her four major wins. Defending champion JoAnne Carner finished at 312 (+24), thirteen strokes back.

With a winner's share of $6,000, the 1972 edition was the first to exceed that of the inaugural championship in 1946, the only one conducted as a match play event. The course conditions at Winged Foot were soft, affected by the recent heavy rains of tropical storm Agnes, originally a hurricane.  Two-time champion Louise Suggs made the cut at age 48.

The championship was previously held at the East Course in 1957; the adjacent West Course has hosted many major championships.

Past champions in the field

Source:

Final leaderboard
Sunday, July 2, 1972

Source:

References

External links
Golf Observer final leaderboard
U.S. Women's Open Golf Championship
U.S. Women's Open – past champions – 1972

U.S. Women's Open
Golf in New York (state)
Sports competitions in New York (state)
Mamaroneck, New York
U.S. Women's Open
U.S. Women's Open
U.S. Women's Open Golf
U.S. Women's Open Golf
U.S. Women's Open Golf
Women's sports in New York (state)